Lisciano Niccone is a comune (municipality) in the Province of Perugia in the Italian region Umbria, located about 25 km northwest of Perugia.

Lisciano Niccone borders the following municipalities: Cortona, Passignano sul Trasimeno, Tuoro sul Trasimeno, Umbertide.

It is of medieval origin, and belonged to the comune of Perugia and, from the 16th century, to the Papal States. In its territory are the remains of a castle (11th century) and a church from the same period, dedicated to St. Nicholas.

Demographic evolution

References

External links
 Official website

Cities and towns in Umbria